Robert Alan Chapek (born 1960) is a former American media executive who was the chief executive officer (CEO) of The Walt Disney Company from 2020 to 2022.

Before becoming CEO, Chapek had a 26-year career with The Walt Disney Company, beginning in the Home Entertainment division, and eventually rising to become Chairman of Parks & Resorts then to Chief Executive Officer. Chapek, who had a controversial tenure as CEO, was dismissed from the position on November 20, 2022, and then succeeded by his predecessor, Bob Iger.

Early life and education
Robert Chapek was born in 1960 in the suburbs of Chicago to a working mother and father, Marie (Lofay) and Bernard W. Chapek. He grew up in Hammond, Indiana. His father was a World War II veteran. His family went on annual trips to Walt Disney World.

Chapek graduated from George Rogers Clark Jr./Sr. High School in 1977. He has a Bachelor of Science degree in microbiology from Indiana University Bloomington and a Master of Business Administration from Michigan State University. He worked for the H. J. Heinz Company in brand management and in advertising for J. Walter Thompson before joining The Walt Disney Company in 1993.

Disney

Home Entertainment 
Chapek began his Disney career in 1993 as the marketing director for the company's Buena Vista Home Entertainment division, which at that time was focused on VHS tapes. The CEO Michael Eisner described Chapek by saying, "He was always an executive that you knew would be on the rise... He knew how to grow the business while adjusting to the changing marketplace, which was intense." Chapek is credited for bringing Disney's home entertainment division into the digital age, by focusing on releasing properties on DVD and later Blu-ray discs. In 2006, he was promoted to become the president of Buena Vista Home Entertainment. In 2009, he became president of distribution for Walt Disney Studios.  Since Chapek began his ascent to the top of the Walt Disney Company from its home video division, he has been called "the home entertainment industry’s single biggest success story."

President of Consumer Products 
Chapek was appointed president of Disney Consumer Products in September 2011. After the acquisition of Lucasfilm, Chapek integrated Star Wars merchandise into Disney's licensing program, ensuring that Disney became the world's largest licensor of intellectual property. In 2013, Chapek secured a deal with Hasbro, whereby the toy company paid Disney $80 million in royalties to extend the license for Marvel toys and an agreement for Hasbro to pay Disney up to $225 million for the rights to forthcoming Star Wars merchandise.

In 2014, Chapek launched the Disney Imagicademy, which was a suite of numerous tablet and smart-phone apps designed to give children high quality learning games. This was Disney's first full foray into the learning-app market. Chapek said he spearheaded this initiative after numerous parents told his department that they found it difficult to find high quality learning apps out of the thousands that were available online.

Parks and Resorts 
On February 23, 2015, Chapek was named chairman of Walt Disney Parks and Resorts effective that day to replace Thomas O. Staggs, who was promoted to Disney chief operating officer earlier in the month. Chapek immediately began working towards the completion and launch of Shanghai Disneyland in 2016, which hosted over 11 million guests in its first year of operation. He also oversaw the completion and launch of Pandora – The World of Avatar at Disney's Animal Kingdom in 2017. Chapek also directly managed the construction and opening of the new Star Wars: Galaxy's Edge lands at Disneyland and Walt Disney World. Disney said of Galaxy's Edge, "It's the most immersive land we have ever built," citing the themed restaurants, shops and roaming interactive characters. Disney reportedly spent $1 billion on the sprawling 14-acre land in Disneyland in Anaheim, prompting CNN to comment that "Disney spared no expense."

As Chairman of Parks and Resorts, Chapek invested over $24 billion into the theme parks, attractions, hotels and cruise ships. The New York Times noted that Chapek's spending was more money than Disney spent in acquiring Pixar, Marvel and Lucasfilm combined.

In the fall of 2017, after parks and resorts recorded at 14% increase in operating income, many in the media began to speculate that Chapek would likely succeed Bob Iger as the next Disney CEO.

During his time at parks and resorts, Chapek has received criticism from some within the Disney fan community due to the use of existing intellectual property in the parks.

In March 2018, after a reorganization of divisions in order to prepare for the launch of Disney+, Chapek was given back the consumer products divisions (including the Disney Stores), in addition to his responsibilities for all of the parks and resorts and related experiences. Then, CEO Bob Iger said, "Bob [Chapek] comes to this new role with an impressive record of success at both parks and resorts and consumer products, and he is the perfect leader to run these combined teams." This furthered speculation that Chapek would be Iger's successor.

In August 2019, Chapek announced that he had negotiated a retail collaboration to open 25 mini Disney Store shops within select Target department stores across the United States. Chapek stated that people who purchase Disney products were already likely to shop at Target, and the deal gives Disney the opportunity to expand its own footprint beyond traditional shopping malls. The Disney mini-shops will be an average of 750 square feet and be located near Target's kids clothing and toy departments. They'll have more than 450 items, including more than 100 products previously only available at Disney retail locations.

On May 18, 2020, Chapek announced Josh D'Amaro as his successor to the position of chairman of Disney Parks, Experiences and Products.

Chief executive officer 
In February 2020, Chapek was named chief executive officer of the Walt Disney Company replacing Bob Iger, who would remain as executive chairman until the end of 2021. This was considered a surprise to many Disney employees, who had seen Kevin Mayer as the heir apparent to Iger. In April 2020, Chapek was elected to the Walt Disney Company's board of directors. It was later revealed, the same month, that while Chapek remained CEO, Iger had resumed control of the company's operational duties for the time being, due to the COVID-19 pandemic.

In numerous interviews with financial news outlets during the pandemic, Chapek has said he is focusing on opening Disney's theme parks. In May 2020, Shanghai Disneyland opened with limited guest capacity capped at approximately 24,000 visitors per day, pursuant to government regulations. Chapek acknowledged that this was a "baby step" but found the attendance figures encouraging, considering that the limited number of tickets were selling out. Chapek vowed to increase capacity in the weeks to come, albeit in a conservative manner.

Chapek stated that upon the reopening of Walt Disney World in July 2020, both employees and guests would be required to take temperature checks, wear face masks, and observe social distancing guidelines. He said that the company would continue to work with local government and healthcare professionals to open the parks responsibly. He added that when the parks reopened, the first attraction he will ride would be Pirates of the Caribbean. In October 2020, Chapek agreed to keep Disney World at only 25% capacity until the CDC issued new guidance, and also stated that with regards to reopening Disneyland in California, "It's not much of a negotiation. It's pretty much a mandate that we stay closed." In March 2021, after California eased COVID-19 restrictions, he then stated, "Here in California, we're encouraged by the positive trends we're seeing and we're hopeful they'll continue to improve and we'll be able to reopen our Parks to guests with limited capacity by late April." By July 2021, Walt Disney World had officially ended their mask mandate (except while on Disney transportation) and temperature checks, and were operating at higher capacity. That same month, fireworks shows at both Walt Disney World and Disneyland returned.

In October 2020, Chapek spoke about the company's decision to begin focusing on streaming media, including Disney+, and direct-to-consumer advertising. Multiple films that were originally slated for theatrical releases, including Mulan and Soul, did not receive theatrical releases and instead debuted on Disney+. Mulan was offered on Disney+ for a premium fee, while Soul was offered for no additional cost.

Florida's Parental Rights in Education Act 

In 2022, as Florida passed its Parental Rights in Education Act (known by critics as the "Don't Say Gay law"), reports rose that Disney funded the legislators who wrote and sponsored the bill; this conflicted with the company's pro-LGBT+ image. In a company memo, Chapek refused to criticize the legislation and played down the company's backing of anti-LGBT+ legislators. Chapek's statements and actions were heavily criticized, including by several members of Disney's creative talent. Following the criticism, Chapek reversed course claiming the company was "opposed to the bill from the outset" and would be donating to several LGBT+ organizations; while he had plans to meet with Florida Governor Ron DeSantis who supports the bill. One of the organizations, the Human Rights Campaign, refused the funds from Disney until "meaningful action" is taken. The day after, Chapek formally apologized for his prior statements and announced that the company will be ceasing donations to all political parties in Florida while looking to further improve their support for LGBT+ causes.

Dismissal from Disney 
In June 2022, Chapek signed a three-year contract extension to remain as Walt Disney Company CEO. However, on November 20, 2022, Iger was reinstated as the CEO. According to Disney insiders through CNBC, Iger was formally requested to return as CEO on the previous Friday, and Chapek was notified of his ouster on Sunday night. The board, through chair Susan Arnold, cited Disney's negative earnings report released at the beginning of the month and believed that Iger was "uniquely situated" to lead Disney.

The New York Times further reported that Chapek had portrayed a "happy go lucky" mentality during the conference call held after the November 8th earnings report. Chapek was also criticized by the NYT for "implausibly" emphasizing the success of Mickey's Not-So-Scary Halloween Party, which is not a major event for the parks or the company as a whole. Calls for Chapek's removal were emphasized that day by Mad Money host Jim Cramer, who particularly aimed criticism towards Disney's "balance sheet from hell".

Chapek's exit package is expected to be worth $23.4 million. That includes the remainder of his CEO salary at $6.5 million and a pension worth $16.9 million which accumulated over his 30-year career at Disney.

Personal life
Chapek has been married to his wife Cynthia since 1980 and together they have three children, including producer Brian Chapek, and four grandchildren.

References

External links
 Corporate biography
 

1960 births
Living people
People from Hammond, Indiana
Heinz people
Disney executives
Michigan State University alumni
Indiana University Bloomington alumni
20th-century American businesspeople
21st-century American businesspeople